Vasum latiriforme is a rare species of medium-sized predatory sea snail, a marine gastropod mollusk in the family Turbinellidae, subfamily Vasinae, the vase snails.

Description
The lenth of the shell attains 65 mm.
.

Distribution
This marine species occurs in the Gulf of Mexico and off Tanzania.

References

 Rehder H.A. & Abbott R.T. (1951). Some new and interesting mollusks from the deeper waters of the Gulf of Mexico. Revista de la Sociedad Malacologica "Carlos de la Torre". 8(2): 53-66, pls 8-9.
 Rosenberg, G.; Moretzsohn, F.; García, E. F. (2009). Gastropoda (Mollusca) of the Gulf of Mexico, Pp. 579–699 in: Felder, D.L. and D.K. Camp (eds.), Gulf of Mexico–Origins, Waters, and Biota. Texas A&M Press, College Station, Texas.

External links
 *  Abbott, R. T. (1959). The family Vasidae in the Indo-Pacific. Indo-Pacific Mollusca. 1 (1): 15-32

latiriforme
Taxa named by Jean-Baptiste Lamarck
Gastropods described in 1951